William Ward-Higgs (3 January 186621 June 1936) was an English lawyer and songwriter who wrote "Sussex by the Sea": The unofficial anthem of that county, a regimental march of the Royal Sussex Regiment, and the official song of Brighton & Hove Albion F.C.

He was born on 3January 1866 at Whitmore, Talbot Road, in Southport. For much of his life, he worked in London as a solicitor. From , he lived at Hollywood House in Bersted, West Sussex. He wrote "Sussex by the Sea" when his favourite sister-in-law became engaged to Captain Waithman of the 2nd Battalion, Royal Sussex Regiment. He may have been inspired by Rudyard Kipling's poem Sussex, which ends with the line "Yea, Sussex by the sea!"he had previously set to music several of Kipling's Barrack-Room Ballads. The song was published in 1907. Subsequently, he moved back to London. He is buried in Bersted churchyard.

References

External links

1866 births
1936 deaths
1936 suicides
English solicitors
English songwriters
History of football in England
Musicians from Southport
People from Bersted
People with epilepsy
Suicides in England